USS Seagull (AM-30) was an  acquired by the United States Navy for the dangerous task of removing mines from minefields laid in the water to prevent ships from passing.

Seagull was laid down on 15 June 1918 by the Gas Engine and Power Co., Morris Heights, New York; launched on 24 December 1918; sponsored by Mrs. C.G. Amory; and commissioned on 7 March 1919 as Minesweeper No. 30.

World War I mine barrage clearance 
Following shakedown, Seagull proceeded to Boston, Massachusetts, whence she sailed for Scotland and duty with the North Sea Mine Detachment. Departing on 28 June, she arrived at Kirkwall on 10 July to join other units already engaged in clearing the waters between Scotland and Norway of the mine barrage planted during World War I. On 30 September, during the seventh and final sweeping operation, Seagull was damaged by the explosion of an upper-level mine. On the completion of repairs, she departed England with others of the force; and, after stops at Brest and the Azores, set out to recross the Atlantic. En route, storms slowed her progress, and the small amount of fuel she had received at Brest ran out. The extra fuel carried by  eased the situation and enabled the force to arrive back in the United States in early November. On the 19th, the ships gathered at Tompkinsville, New York, where, on the 25th, the North Sea Mine Force was dissolved.

Post-World War I Pacific operations 
Seagull, assigned to the Pacific Fleet, proceeded first to Charleston, South Carolina,  for repairs; then - with the new year, 1920 — continued on to San Diego, California, arriving on 30 January. Designated AM-30 seven months later, she operated as a unit of the 3rd Division, 4th Mine Squadron until June 1922 when she was ordered to serve as a submarine tender at Pearl Harbor. There, with only occasional interruptions for inter-island towing and passenger runs, fleet problems, and overhauls during the 1920s and 1930s and to assist in salvage operations at Pearl Harbor after 7 December 1941, she provided services - torpedo recovery, target towing, and escort - until after the close of World War II.

Decommissioning 
Redesignated twice during the war, to Ocean Tug AT-141 on 1 June 1942 and to ATO-141 on 15 May 1944, Seagull departed Pearl Harbor for the last time in October 1945 and arrived at Mare Island, California, on the 12th to await inactivation. Assigned to SubRon 3 during the interim, she was decommissioned on 5 September 1946; struck from the Navy list on 15 October 1946; and transferred to the Maritime Commission for disposal on 2 May 1947.

References

External links 

 
 Tenders - USS Seagull
 uboat.net - USS Seagull

 

Lapwing-class minesweepers
Ships built in Morris Heights, Bronx
1918 ships
World War I minesweepers of the United States
Submarine tenders of the United States Navy
World War II auxiliary ships of the United States
Lapwing-class minesweepers converted to tugs